The Philadelphia Story is a 1940 American romantic comedy film directed by George Cukor, starring Cary Grant, Katharine Hepburn, James Stewart, and Ruth Hussey. Based on the 1939 Broadway play of the same name by Philip Barry, the film is about a socialite whose wedding plans are complicated by the simultaneous arrival of her ex-husband and a tabloid magazine journalist. The socialite character of the play—performed by Hepburn in the film—was inspired by Helen Hope Montgomery Scott (1904–1995), a Philadelphia socialite known for her hijinks, who married a friend of playwright Barry.

Written for the screen by  Donald Ogden Stewart and an uncredited Waldo Salt, it is considered one of the best examples of a comedy of remarriage, a genre popular in the 1930s and 1940s in which a couple divorce, flirt with outsiders, and then remarry—a useful story-telling device at a time when the depiction of extramarital affairs was blocked by the Production Code.

The film was Hepburn's first big hit following several flops, which had placed her on a 1938 list of actors considered to be "box office poison" compiled by Manhattan movie theater owner Harry Brandt. Hepburn acquired the film rights to the play, which she had also starred in, with the help of Howard Hughes in order to control it as a vehicle for her screen comeback. According to a Turner Broadcasting documentary MGM: When the Lion Roars, after Metro-Goldwyn-Mayer purchased the film rights, they were skeptical about Hepburn's box office appeal, so MGM studio head Louis B. Mayer took an unusual precaution by engaging two A-list male stars (Grant and Stewart) to support Hepburn.

Nominated for six Academy Awards, the film won two: James Stewart for Best Actor, and Donald Ogden Stewart for Best Adapted Screenplay. MGM remade the film in 1956 as a musical, retitled High Society, starring Bing Crosby, Grace Kelly, and Frank Sinatra.

The Philadelphia Story was produced by Joseph L. Mankiewicz, and was selected for preservation in the United States National Film Registry in 1995.

Plot

Tracy Lord is the elder daughter of a wealthy Philadelphia Main Line socialite family. She was married to C.K. Dexter Haven, a yacht designer and member of her social set, but divorced him two years prior, because, according to her father, he does not measure up to the standards she sets for all her friends and family: He drank too much for her taste, and, according to him, as she became critical of him, he drank more. Their only interaction while married, the film's opening scene, is her breaking his golf clubs and him pushing her to the ground. Now, she is about to marry nouveau riche "man of the people" George Kittredge.

In New York, Spy magazine publisher Sidney Kidd is eager to cover the wedding, and assigns reporter Macaulay "Mike" Connor and photographer Liz Imbrie. Kidd intends to use the assistance of Dexter, who has been working for Spy in South America. Dexter tells Kidd that he will introduce them as friends of Tracy's brother Junius (a U.S. diplomat in Argentina). Tracy is not fooled, but Dexter tells her that Kidd has threatened the reputation of her family with an innuendo-laden article about her father's affair with a dancer. Tracy deeply resents her father's infidelity, which has prompted her parents to live separately. Nonetheless, to protect her family's reputation, she agrees to let Mike and Liz stay and cover her wedding.

Dexter is welcomed back with open arms by Tracy's mother Margaret and teenage sister Dinah, much to Tracy's frustration. She soon discovers that Mike has admirable qualities, and even seeks out his book of short stories in the public library. As the wedding nears, she finds herself torn between her fiancé George, Dexter, and Mike.

The night before the wedding, Tracy gets drunk for only the second time in her life, kisses Mike, and ultimately takes an innocent midnight swim with him. When George observes Mike carrying an intoxicated Tracy into the house afterward, he assumes the worst. The next day, he tells her that he was shocked and feels entitled to an explanation before going ahead with the wedding. Yet, she admits she really has none, and realizes that he does not really know her at all. He has loved her as a perfect, ideal angel, an embodiment of goodness—a virginal statue—and not as a person, so she breaks off the engagement. By now she better understands her own imperfections and her criticism of others. Tracy realizes that all the guests have arrived and are waiting for the ceremony to begin. Mike quickly volunteers to marry her, but she graciously declines because she perceives that Liz is in love with him. Then, Dexter, who clearly planned to win her back all along, offers to remarry her, and she gladly accepts.

Cast

Production

Broadway playwright Barry wrote the play specifically for Hepburn, who ended up backing the play, and forgoing a salary in return for a percentage of its profits. Her co-stars were Joseph Cotten as Dexter Haven, Van Heflin as Mike Connor, and Shirley Booth as Liz Imbrie.

The original play, starring Hepburn, ran for 417 performances. It made over $1 million in box office sales and later went on to tour, performing another 250 times and making over $750,000 in sales. The play also originally featured another character named Sandy. However that role was eliminated for the movie to make more room for the character development of Mike.

At this time, Hepburn hoped to create a film vehicle for herself which would erase the label of "box office poison" that she had acquired after a number of commercial failures (including the classic Bringing Up Baby). So, she happily accepted the film rights to the play from Howard Hughes, who had bought them for her. She then convinced MGM's Mayer to buy them from her for only $250,000, in return for Hepburn having veto over producer, director, screenwriter, and cast.

Hepburn selected director George Cukor, in whose films A Bill of Divorcement (1932) and Little Women (1933) she had acted, and Donald Ogden Stewart, a friend of Barry's and a specialist at adapting plays to the big screen, as writer.

Hepburn wanted Clark Gable to play Dexter Haven and Spencer Tracy to play Mike Connor, but both had other commitments. Grant agreed to play the part on condition that he be given top billing, and that his salary would be $137,000, which he donated to the British War Relief Society. The pairing of Cukor and Gable would have been problematic in any case, as they had not gotten along on the recent Gone with the Wind, and Cukor had been replaced with Victor Fleming, who was a friend of Gable's.

The film was in production from July 5 to August 14, 1940 at MGM's studios in Culver City.  It was shot in six weeks and came in five days under schedule. At one point, Stewart slipped in his hiccuping during the drunk scene. Grant turned to him, surprised, and said, "Excuse me", then appears to have stifled a laugh. The scene was kept, and was not reshot.

Stewart had been extremely nervous about the scene in which Connor recites poetry to Tracy, and believed that he would perform badly. Noël Coward was visiting the set that day, and was asked by Cukor to say something to encourage him. Stewart was also quite uncomfortable with some of the dialogue, especially in the swimming pool scene.

Hepburn performed the dive into the swimming pool by herself, without the help of doubles.

The film premiered in New York City on December 26, 1940, and it was shown in select theaters in December, but MGM had agreed to hold its general release until January 1941 in order to not compete with the stage play, which was no longer playing on Broadway, but was touring the country. It went into general American release on January 17, 1941. It broke a box office record at Radio City Music Hall by taking in $600,000 in just six weeks.

The model sailboat that Grant gives Hepburn is based on an actual boat, the True Love (originally the Venona II, based on the Malabar design by John Alden built for racing), which currently sails on Seneca Lake out of Watkins Glen, New York, as an excursion boat for Schooner Excursions, Inc.

Reception

Box office
According to MGM records, the film earned $2,374,000 in the US and Canada, and $885,000 elsewhere, resulting in a profit of $1,272,000.

Critical
Writing for The New York Times in 1940, Bosley Crowther wrote that the film "has just about everything that a blue-chip comedy should have—a witty, romantic script derived by Donald Ogden Stewart out of Philip Barry's successful play; the flavor of high-society elegance, in which the patrons invariably luxuriate; and a splendid cast of performers headed by Hepburn, Stewart, and Grant. If it doesn't play out this year and well along into next, they should turn the Music Hall into a shooting gallery ... Metro and Director George Cukor have graciously made it apparent, in the words of a character, that one of 'the prettiest sights in this pretty world is the privileged classes enjoying their privileges'. And so, in this instance, will you, too." Seventy-five years later, Peter Bradshaw wrote "However stagily preposterous, George Cukor's 1940 movie The Philadelphia Story, now rereleased, is also utterly beguiling, funny and romantic. ... The fun and wit rise like champagne bubbles, but there is a deceptive strength in the writing and performances." Bradshaw also notes that the film is the "most famous example of the intriguing and now defunct prewar genre of 'comedy of remarriage.

The film has a 100% rating on Rotten Tomatoes based on 101 reviews, with an average rating of 9/10. The consensus reads: "Offering a wonderfully witty script, spotless direction from George Cukor, and typically excellent lead performances, The Philadelphia Story is an unqualified classic." The site also ranked it as the Best Romantic Comedy of all time.

The film was the last of four starring Grant and Hepburn, following Sylvia Scarlett (1935), Bringing Up Baby (1938), and Holiday (1938).

Awards and honors

The film was nominated for six Academy Awards, winning two (Best Actor and Best Screenplay). At the 1940 ceremony, James Stewart did not expect to win and was not planning to attend the ceremony, but he was called and "advised" to show up in a dinner jacket. He said he had voted for Henry Fonda for his performance in The Grapes of Wrath, and always felt the award had been given to him as compensation for not winning for his portrayal of Jefferson Smith in Mr. Smith Goes to Washington the previous year. Donald Ogden Stewart, on the other hand, declared upon winning his Oscar: "I have no one to thank but myself!"

The film was named the third best of the year by Film Daily.

In 1995, the film was deemed "culturally, historically, or aesthetically significant" by the Library of Congress, and was selected for preservation in the United States National Film Registry.

The film was included in various American Film Institute lists:
 1998: AFI's 100 Years...100 Movies – #51
 2000: AFI's 100 Years...100 Laughs – #15
 2002: AFI's 100 Years...100 Passions – #44
 2007: AFI's 100 Years...100 Movies (10th Anniversary Edition) – #44
 2008: AFI's 10 Top 10 – #5 Romantic Comedy Film

Adaptations
The stars of the film appeared in a one-hour radio adaptation on the premiere episode of the War Office's special Victory Theater summer series, airing July 20, 1942. This episode was specially produced by Lux Radio Theatre volunteer personnel as their donation to the Victory Theater series, and it aired under government, not Lux, sponsorship. Lux Radio Theatre produced a second adaptation for its own use on June 14, 1943, with Robert Taylor, Loretta Young, and Robert Young. The film was also adapted for two half-hour episodes of The Screen Guild Theater, first with Greer Garson, Henry Fonda, and Fred MacMurray (April 5, 1942), then with Hepburn, Grant, and Stewart reprising their film roles (March 17, 1947).

The film was adapted in 1956 as the MGM musical High Society, starring Bing Crosby, Grace Kelly, Frank Sinatra, Celeste Holm, and Louis Armstrong, directed by Charles Walters.

See also
 List of films with a 100% rating on Rotten Tomatoes, a film review aggregator website

References

Sources

External links

 
 
 
 
 
 Historic reviews, photo gallery at CaryGrant.net
 
"The Philadelphia Story: A Fine, Pretty World", an essay by Farran Smith Nehme at the Criterion Collection

Streaming audio
 The Philadelphia Story on Lux Radio Theater: July 20, 1942
 The Philadelphia Story on Lux Radio Theater: June 14, 1943
 The Philadelphia Story on Screen Guild Theater: March 17, 1947

1940 films
1940s English-language films
1940 romantic comedy films
1940s screwball comedy films
American romantic comedy films
American screwball comedy films
American black-and-white films
Comedy of remarriage films
Films scored by Franz Waxman
Films about social class
Films about tabloid journalism
Films about weddings
American films based on plays
Films directed by George Cukor
Films featuring a Best Actor Academy Award-winning performance 
Films set in Philadelphia
Films whose writer won the Best Adapted Screenplay Academy Award
United States National Film Registry films
Films set in country houses
Articles containing video clips
Films produced by Joseph L. Mankiewicz
Films with screenplays by Waldo Salt
Films with screenplays by Donald Ogden Stewart
Metro-Goldwyn-Mayer films
1940s American films